Claus H. Henneberg (4 February 1936 – 22 February 1998) was a German librettist and translator. He worked as dramaturge for the Cologne Opera and the Deutsche Oper Berlin. In the 1976/77 season, he was the Intendant of the Opernhaus Kiel.

Librettos 
 Melusine, opera in four acts (1970) after the play of the same name (1920/30, premiered in 1956) by Yvan Goll), music: Aribert Reimann, premiere 29 April 1971 Schlosstheater Schwetzingen (Schwetzingen Festival)
 Kinkaku-ji (The golden Pavillon), opera in three acts (1976), after the novel 金閣寺 (The Temple of the Golden Pavilion, 1956) by Yukio Mishima), music: Toshiro Mayuzumi, premiered 23 June 1976 Deutsche Oper Berlin
 Fettklößchen, opera buffa after the novella Boule de suif (1880) by Guy de Maupassant), music: , premiered 1976 Deutsche Oper Berlin
 Enrico, dramatic comedy in nine scenes (1989–91) after Enrico IV (premiered 1922) by Luigi Pirandello, music: Manfred Trojahn, premiered 10 April 1991 Schwetzingen Festival, conducted by Dennis Russell Davies, staged by Peter Mussbach
 Drei Schwestern, opera in three sequences (1996/97; after the play of the same name (1900, premiered 1901] by Anton Čechov, music: Péter Eötvös, premiered 13 March 1998 Lyon Opera, conducted by Kent Nagano and the composer
 Was ihr wollt, opera in four acts (1997/98), after Shakespeare's Twelfth Night, or What You Will (c. 1600), music: Trojahn, premiered 24 May 1998 Bavarian State Opera. conducted by Michael Boder, staged by Mussbach
 Thomas Chatterton, opera in two parts (1994–98) after the play of the same name (1955, premiered 1956) by Hans Henny Jahnn, music: Matthias Pintscher, premiered 25 May 1998 Semperoper, conducted by Marc Albrecht, staged by Marco Arturo Marelli
 Die Sündflut, music theatre (with Michael Hampe after the play of the same name (premiered 1924) by Ernst Barlach, music: , premiered 13 April 2002 Badisches Staatstheater Karlsruhe, staged by Hampe, conducted by Kazushi Ōno
 Pascha, chamber opera in one act, also known as Corps de Ballet (1996) after the story  The Chorus Girl by Čechov, music: Oliver Gruhn.

Editions 
 Hans Magnus Enzensberger / Hans Werner Henze and others: El Cimarrón. Ein Werkbericht. Schott, Mainz 1971

External links 
 Claus H. Henneberg's discography on Discogs.
 

German male writers
German librettists
Opera managers
1936 births
1998 deaths
20th-century German translators